George Lawson was a Puisne Justice of the Supreme Court of Ceylon. Lawson was a co-founder of the Law Library of Colombo and it is believed he was of Jewish origin.

References

Citations

Bibliography

 

Sri Lankan Jews
Puisne Justices of the Supreme Court of Ceylon
19th-century Sri Lankan people